Barbara Schett was the defending champion but lost in the semifinals to Sandrine Testud.

Testud won in the final 7–5, 6–3 against Elena Makarova.

Seeds
A champion seed is indicated in bold text while text in italics indicates the round in which that seed was eliminated.

  Barbara Paulus (semifinals)
  Sandrine Testud (champion)
  Barbara Schett (semifinals)
  Florencia Labat (second round)
  Silvia Farina (quarterfinals)
  Virginia Ruano-Pascual (quarterfinals)
  Francesca Lubiani (first round)
  Flora Perfetti (first round)

Draw

External links
 1997 Internazionali Femminili di Palermo Draw

Internazionali Femminili di Palermo
1997 WTA Tour